Charles Felton Jarvis (November 15, 1934 – January 3, 1981) was an American record producer and singer.

Career
As an RCA Victor record producer, Jarvis was responsible for most recordings of Elvis Presley in the years 1966–1977. He also released his own singles in the late 1950s and early 1960s. However, he was more successful as a record producer.  He produced the first six albums by John Hartford, and the artists Tommy Roe, Michael Nesmith, Fats Domino, Jimmy Dean, Fess Parker, Charley Pride, Carl Perkins, Skeeter Davis, Willie Nelson, Gladys Knight & the Pips, Maria Dallas, and Jerry Reed.

Guitar Man
In mid-December 1980, Jarvis finished an Elvis Presley project for RCA Records called Guitar Man. It contained ten previously recorded songs that matched Presley's original vocals with new overdubbed instrumental tracks.

On December 16, 1980, Jarvis and Jerry Flowers, an employee of RCA Records discussed questions for a radio interview to be held the following week on the occasion of the album's release.  Their conversation was captured on cassette tape and includes thoughts on the Guitar Man project and Jarvis's career.

The formal radio interview never took place because Jarvis suffered a stroke on December 19, 1980.  He was admitted to a Nashville hospital and died there on January 3, 1981, at the age of 46.

Felton Jarvis is buried in the Mount Hope Cemetery in Franklin, Tennessee.

Discography

Singles
 "Honest John (The Workin' Man's Friend)" / "Don't Knock Elvis" (1959) – on the label Viva Records
 "Swingin' Cat" / "Honest John (The Working Man's Friend)" (1960) – on the label Thunder Int. Columbia Miss
 "Dimples" / "Little Wheel" (1960) – on the label  Thunder Int. Columbia Miss
 "Indian Love Call" / "Goin' Down Town" (1961) – on the label  MGM
 "Ski King" / "Be-I-Bye" (1964) – on the label  ABC-Paramount
 "Too Many Tigers" / "Knickle Knuckle" (1965) – on the label  ABC-Paramount

References

External links

Felton Jarvis interview with Jerry Flowers recorded December 16, 1980
Felton Jarvis at Elvis Australia

1934 births
1981 deaths
Record producers from Georgia (U.S. state)
American male pop singers
20th-century American male singers
20th-century American singers